Dags-Telegrafen (Danish: Daily Telegraph) was a Danish language conservative newspaper which was published in Copenhagen, Denmark, in the period of 1864–1891.

History and profile
Dags-Telegrafen was established by J. Christian Ferslew in Copenhagen in 1864. The paper had a conservative stance and was the first of such newspapers in Denmark. In fact, it was affiliated with the Conservative Party.

In first half of the 1870s Dags-Telegrafen became one of the best selling newspapers in the country. An evening edition of the paper, Nationaltidende, was launched in 1876. Sophus Peter Tromholt published his auroral observations in Dags-Telegrafen which folded in 1891.

References

External links

1864 establishments in Denmark
1891 disestablishments in Denmark
Conservatism in Denmark
Daily newspapers published in Denmark
Danish-language newspapers
Defunct newspapers published in Denmark
Newspapers published in Copenhagen
Newspapers established in 1864
Publications disestablished in 1891